Fly Me to the Moon... The Great American Songbook Volume V is the fifth title in Rod Stewart's series of covers of pop standards, released on 19 October 2010, and his 26th studio album overall. It has sold 363,000 copies as of October 2012.

Track listing
 "That Old Black Magic" (Harold Arlen, Johnny Mercer) – 4:35
 "Beyond the Sea" (Jack Lawrence, Charles Trenet) – 3:25
 "I've Got You Under My Skin" (Cole Porter) – 3:50
 "What a Difference a Day Makes" (Stanley Adams, María Grever) – 3:21
 "I Get a Kick Out of You" (Porter) – 3:32
 "I've Got the World on a String" (Arlen, Ted Koehler) – 2:52
 "Love Me or Leave Me" (Walter Donaldson, Gus Kahn) – 3:07
 "My Foolish Heart" (Ned Washington, Victor Young) – 3:37
 "September in the Rain" (Al Dubin, Harry Warren) – 2:55
 "Fly Me to the Moon" (Bart Howard) – 2:45
 "Sunny Side of the Street" (Dorothy Fields, Jimmy McHugh) – 2:56
 "Moon River" (Henry Mancini, Mercer) – 2:48

Limited edition bonus CD
 "Bye Bye Blackbird" (Mort Dixon, Ray Henderson) – 4:09
 "All of Me" (Gerald Marks, Seymour Simons) – 3:09
 "She's Funny That Way" (Neil Moret, Richard A. Whiting) – 3:23
 "Cheek to Cheek" (Irving Berlin) – 3:29
 "Ain't Misbehavin'" (Harry Brooks, Andy Razaf, Fats Waller) – 3:48
 "When I Fall in Love" (Edward Heyman, Young) – 3:45

Personnel
 Rod Stewart – lead vocals, backing vocals (11)
 Joe Sample – acoustic piano (1, 7)
 Mike Thompson – acoustic piano (1, 2, 4, 5, 6, 9, 10, 12), synth strings (11), accordion (12), arrangements
 Alex Navarro – synth strings (1-10, 12), acoustic piano (3, 8), vibraphone solo (9)
 Larry Goldings – additional synth strings (3), acoustic piano (11)
 Nick Sample – additional synth strings (4)
 Alicia Morgan – synth strings (7, 12)
 Doug Lloyd – organ (7)
 Larry Koonse – guitar (1, 2, 4, 6, 7, 9, 10, 12)
 Aaron Kaplan – guitar (3, 5, 8, 11)
 Reggie McBride – bass (1, 2)
 Chris Golden – bass (5, 6, 11), double bass (3)
 Trey Henry – bass (4, 7, 9, 10, 12)
 Joel Hamilton – bass (8)
 John Ferraro – drums (1-12)
 Kalani Das – percussion (1)
 Doug Webb – tenor sax solo (1, 2, 3), "stritch" sax solo (5), flute solo (6), tenor saxophone (7, 11), "stritch" saxophone (9), flute (9, 10), clarinet (11), additional horn arrangements
 Andrew Lippman – trombone solo (2)
 Lee Thornburg – brass parts (3, 9), trumpet solo (4), trombone solo (6), flugelhorn solo (8), flugelhorn (10), additional horn arrangements
 Tom Evans – clarinet (11)
 Adrian Woods – cello (3, 6)
 Clive Davis – arrangements
 Richard Perry – arrangements
 Mike Navarro – synth string arrangements
 Alan Broadbent – live string arrangements
 Lauren Wild – backing vocals (1, 5, 7, 8, 9, 11, 12), arrangements, BGV arrangements
 Angela Michael – backing vocals (7, 9, 11, 12)
 Natasha Pierce – backing vocals (7)
 Jeffrey Purrough – backing vocals (7)

Credits (bonus tracks 1-6)
 Rod Stewart – lead vocals
 Mike Thompson – acoustic piano (1, 2, 4, 5, 6), synth strings (6)
 Alex Navarro – synth strings (1, 2, 3, 5), acoustic piano (3), vibraphone solo (5)
 Aaron Kaplan – guitar (1-4, 6)
 Larry Koonse – guitar (1, 5)
 Trey Henry – bass (1, 2, 5)
 Chris Golden – bass (4, 6)
 Reggie McBride – double bass (3)
 John Ferraro – drums 
 Kalani Das – percussion (1)
 Doug Webb – clarinet solo (1), tenor sax solo (3, 6), tenor saxophone (4), clarinet (4), flute (4)
 Lee Thornburg – trumpet solo (2, 3)
 Ariana Hall – backing vocals (1)
 Anita Pointer – backing vocals (1)
 Lauren Wild – backing vocals (1, 4, 5)
 Angela Michael – backing vocals (1, 4)

Production
 Producer – Richard Perry
 Co-Producers – Clive Davis, Rod Stewart and Lauren Wild.
 Recorded by Carter William Humphrey and Jeffrey Purrough
 Additional Engineering and ProTools – Rob Gaudet, Bobby Ginsburg, Paul Meyer, Todd Steinhauer and Seth Waldmann.
 Mixed by Richard Perry and Jeffrey Purrough
 Mastered by Stephen Marcussen at  Marcussen Mastering (Hollywood, CA).
 Art Direction and Design – Josh Cheuse
 Photography – Ketil Dietrichson and Mark Seliger
 Liner Notes – Rod Stewart and Arnold Stiefel 
 Management – Arnold Stiefel for Stiefel Entertainment.
 Project Manager – Lotus Donovan for Stiefel Entertainment.
 Assistant Production Manager – Ben McCarthy
 Legal – Alan Grubman and Barry Tyerman

Charts

Weekly charts

Year-end charts

Certifications

References

External links

2010 albums
Rod Stewart albums
Albums produced by Clive Davis
J Records albums
Traditional pop albums
Covers albums